Shut Down is a multi-artist compilation album released by Capitol Records in mid-June 1963. It contains hot rod music from acts such as the Beach Boys, Robert Mitchum, the Cheers and the Super Stocks. The title is hot rod slang referring to the defeat of an opponent in a drag race.

The album was compiled by Nick Venet and Gary Usher, according to biographer James Murphy, to "trad[e] on the success" of the Beach Boys' hits "409" and "Shut Down". It was a commercial success, peaking at number 8 on August 17 during a 46-week chart run. In 1964, it was followed by Shut Down Volume 2, which only had songs by the Beach Boys.

Track listing

Charts

References

Capitol Records albums
1963 compilation albums